Cancer Immunology Research is a monthly peer-reviewed medical journal published by the American Association for Cancer Research. It covers research and clinical trials related to the study of cancer immunology. The editors-in-chief are Robert D. Schreiber and Philip Greenberg.  The journal was established in 2013.

Abstracting and indexing
The journal is abstracted and indexed in:

According to the Journal Citation Reports, the journal has a 2021 impact factor of 12.020.

References

External links

Oncology journals
English-language journals
American Association for Cancer Research academic journals
Monthly journals
Publications established in 2013